Bennington Township, Ohio, may refer to:

Bennington Township, Licking County, Ohio
Bennington Township, Morrow County, Ohio

Ohio township disambiguation pages